The second season of the television series Ally McBeal commenced airing in the United States on September 14, 1998, concluded on May 24, 1999, and consisted of 23 episodes. On March 22, 1999, Fox aired a special titled Life and Trials of Ally McBeal in which Bill Maher interviewed the cast after nearly finishing two seasons of the show. The special was produced by a different company. The entire season originally aired Mondays at 9pm, just like the season before.

It was released on DVD as a six disc boxed set under the title of Ally McBeal: Season Two on October 7, 2002. and the U.S. on April 6, 2010.

The second season had an average rating of 13.8 million viewers in the United States and was ranked #20 on the complete ranking sheet of all the year's shows. This was the highest rated season of Ally McBeal.

On the 51st Primetime Emmy Awards, the show won three Emmy Awards in the categories of Outstanding Comedy Series, Outstanding Sound Mixing for a Comedy Series or a Special for the episode Love's Illusions, and the Outstanding Guest Actress in a Comedy Series for Tracey Ullman's portrayal of Dr. Tracy on the episode Sideshow. On the 56th Golden Globe Awards, the show won in the category of Best Series second year in a row.

Crew
The season was produced by 20th Century Fox Home Entertainment and David E. Kelley Productions. The sole executive producer was the creator David E. Kelley, who also wrote all 23 episodes just like the season before, with the exception of co-writing the episode Just Looking with Shelly Landau. Jonathan Pontell and Jeffrey Kramer served as the co-executive producers.

Cast
The second season had ten major roles receive star billing. Calista Flockhart as Ally McBeal, Greg Germann as Richard Fish, Peter MacNicol as John Cage, Jane Krakowski as Elaine Vassal, Lisa Nicole Carson as Renée Raddick, Gil Bellows as Billy Thomas and Courtney Thorne-Smith as Georgia Thomas, all returned to the main cast. Former recurring star Vonda Shepard was upgraded to series regular after appearing in nearly every episode of the previous season.

Lucy Liu and Portia de Rossi premiered as new characters, Ling Woo and Nelle Porter, in the season premiere and appeared on recurring status until episode Making Spirits Bright, when they were also upgraded to series regulars. Lucy Liu originally auditioned for the role of Nelle, but David E. Kelley ended up creating a whole new character for her.

Various supporting characters from season one returned to reprise their recurring roles, including Dyan Cannon as Judge Whipper Cone; Albert Hall as Judge Seymore Walsh; Jennifer Holliday as Lisa Knowles; Phil Leeds as Judge Happy Boyle; Jesse L. Martin as Dr. Greg Butters; Harrison Page as Reverend Mark Newman; Tracey Ullman as Dr. Tracy Clark; and Renée Elise Goldsberry, Vatrena King and Sy Smith as the backup singers for Vonda Shepard. The season also included two celebrities: Bruce Willis appearing as a substitute therapist for Ally and Barry White appearing as himself.

Episodes

References

External links
 Ally McBeal Episode List at IMDb.com

1998 American television seasons
1999 American television seasons
Ally McBeal